David Grutman is an owner and partner in several Miami-based restaurants and night clubs. Rolling Stone magazine has listed Grutman as one of the 50 most important people in electronic dance music.

Personal life
David was born and raised in Naples, Florida to a Jewish family. He graduated from Barron G. Collier High School in 1993, and holds a degree in finance from the University of Florida. He married Isabela Rangel in 2016. They have two daughters.

Career
Grutman opened the LIV nightclub at the Fontainebleau Miami Beach hotel in 2008, and it was the fifth highest grossing nightclub in the United States in 2014. Grutman subsequently opened the club Story in 2013, followed by the restaurant Komodo, the café OTL, the restaurant Planta South Beach, and the Swan and Bar Bevy, in which Pharrell is also a partner.    

In 2018, Grutman founded Groot Hospitality as a holding company for his ventures. In 2019, he sold a majority stake in the company to Live Nation Entertainment.

References

1974 births
Living people
Nightclub owners
University of Florida alumni
Businesspeople from Miami
People from Naples, Florida